IFC Pego Cup is a football friendly tournament played in Pego, Alicante, Spain since 2008. The competition is organized by the International Football Company Group and is authorized by UEFA. CSKA Sofia was the first team to win the trophy as they beat Lokomotiv Moskva in the penalty shootout.

This first edition of the UEFA Pego Cup was internationally broadcast through Eurosport.

2008

References

Spanish football friendly trophies